The Ballad of Billie Blue aka Jailbreakin'  is a Christian-themed film that stars Jason Ledger, Renny Roker, Ray Danton, and Sherry Bain. It also features Erik Estrada. A country singer who has a problem with alcohol is sent to prison for a crime he didn't commit.

Story
A country music singer played by Jason Ledger is wrongly convicted of a crime and as a result ends up being on a Southern chain gang.
Marty Allen in a serious role plays a reporter for a scandal newspaper who reports on the singer.

Background

Screenings
The film premiered in Grand Rapids, Michigan in February, 1972.
The film opened Thursday April 20, 1972 at the Holland Theatre and was showing for a week.
It was scheduled for screening at the Peoria Christian Center on Saturday, July 19, 1975. The film was showing at the Grand Theatre in July 1976.
An organization called Christian Young People had the film showing at the Ottawa Technical High School at 8PM, April 26, 1979.

Awards
The film was nominated for two Image Awards.

Releases
The film was released on video with the title   Jailbreakin. It has also been released as Star-Crossed Roads. The video release is 78 minutes. A review by HR in 1972 running time as 107 minutes.  Another source noted that a release of the film through Gateway Films had it 90 minutes.

Reviews
Hanko Herman of The Reformed Free Publishing Association referred to it as "a filthy piece of pornography" in his article "The Christian And Movies" that appeared in Issue: 11, 3/1/1972. This was due to some of the content in the film.

Cast
Johnny Green of Johnny Green and the Greenmen appears in the film. He band also contributed to the music.

Cast list (listed alphabetically)
 Marty Allen ... Harvey Trip
 Sherry Bain ... Reba Stone
 Ray Danton ... Carlton Jacobs
 Erik Estrada ... Justin 
 Jason Ledger ... Billie Blue
 Sherry Miles ... May Blue
 Bob Plekker ...Preacher Bob
 Renny Roker ... Al

References

External links
 Imdb: The Ballad of Billie Blue
 TCM: The Ballad of Billie Blue

Films about evangelicalism
1972 films
1970s English-language films